is a Japanese manga series written and illustrated by Yuki Ozawa. It was serialized in Kodansha's josei manga magazine Be Love from June 2016 to June 2021, with its chapters collected in 16 tankōbon volumes. In 2018, the manga won the 42nd Kodansha Manga Award in the general category.

Plot
Koda Mariko is an 80-year-old veteran writer. Her husband passed away, and she lives with her son and his wife, her grandchildren and her great-grandchildren for four generations. Realizing that she is being treated as a nuisance by her son and his wife and her grandson, Mariko decides to leave her home at the age of 80 and become independent.

Publication
Kodansha collected its chapters in 16 tankōbon volumes, released from November 11, 2016, to July 13, 2021.

Volume list

Reception
As of February 2018, the manga had over 250,000 copies in circulation.

On Takarajimasha's Kono Manga ga Sugoi! list of best manga of 2018 for female readers, the series ranked sixth. The manga was nominated for the 22nd Tezuka Osamu Cultural Prize in 2018. Alongside Fragile, the manga won the 42nd Kodansha Manga Award in the general category in 2018.

References

Further reading

External links
  

Josei manga
Kodansha manga
Winner of Kodansha Manga Award (General)